Kukharczuk is an East Slavic surname derived from the occupation kukhar / kucharz, a cook.

Kukharczuk may refer to:

 Ilya Kukharchuk (b. 1990), a Russian football (soccer) player
 Nina Kukharchuk (1900–1984), maiden name of the late wife of a Soviet premier, Nikita Khrushchev

Slavic-language surnames